The Tourism functional constituency is a functional constituency in the elections for the Legislative Council of Hong Kong first created in 1998.

Composition
After the 2021 electoral overhaul, the Tourism functional constituency is composed of the following bodies—
 bodies that are—
 travel agents holding licences as defined by section 2 of the Travel Agents Ordinance; and
 any of the following—
 corporate members of the Travel Industry Council of Hong Kong entitled to vote at the Board of Directors of the Council;
 corporate members of Hong Kong Association of China Travel Organisers Limited entitled to vote at the Executive Committee of the company;
 corporate members of International Chinese Tourist Association Limited entitled to vote at the Executive Committee of the company;
 corporate members of The Federation of Hong Kong Chinese Travel Agents Limited entitled to vote at the Executive Committee of the company;
 corporate members of Hong Kong Outbound Tour Operators’ Association Limited entitled to vote at the Executive Committee of the company;
 corporate members of Hong Kong Association of Travel Agents Limited entitled to vote at the Executive Committee of the company;
 corporate members of Hongkong Taiwan Tourist Operators Association entitled to vote at the Executive Committee of the Association;
 corporate members of Hongkong Japanese Tour Operators Association Limited entitled to vote at the Executive Committee of the company;
 corporate members of Society of IATA Passenger Agents Limited entitled to vote at the Executive Committee of the company; and
 bodies that are corporate members of The Board of Airline Representatives in Hong Kong entitled to vote at the Executive Committee of the Board; and
 bodies that are corporate members of the Federation of Hong Kong Hotel Owners Limited entitled to vote at general meetings of the company.

Return members

Electoral results

2020s

2010s

2000s

1990s

References

Constituencies of Hong Kong
Constituencies of Hong Kong Legislative Council
Functional constituencies (Hong Kong)
1991 establishments in Hong Kong
Constituencies established in 1991